Dominique Valadié (born 1952) is a French actress. She studied acting at the Conservatoire national supérieur d'art dramatique in Paris. Valadié has been a lecturer at the  Conservatoire national supérieur d'art dramatique since 1983.

Theater

Filmography

References

External links 
 
 

1952 births
Living people
People from Nice
French film actresses
French television actresses
20th-century French actresses
21st-century French actresses
French National Academy of Dramatic Arts alumni